The Women's EuroHockey Club Trophy is an annual field hockey tournament organised by the European Hockey Federation. It is Europe's secondary club hockey tournament for women, behind the Euro Hockey League Women.

History
The tournament was founded in 1983, with an inaugural tournament played out in the same year. The first champions were English club, Slough.

Since its founding, the tournament has been played out every year in the months from April to June.

Competition format

Structure
Each edition of the Women's EuroHockey Club Trophy comprises eight teams. The teams are split into two pools of four, playing in a single round-robin format. At the conclusion of the pool stage, the top ranked teams of each pool contest the final of the tournament, while the second placed teams playoff for third; the same continues for fifth and seventh places.

Point System
Unlike the classic points system of three points for a win, one point for a draw and no points for a loss, this tournament adapts a unique points system. The point allocation for wins, draws and losses is as follows:

 5 Points: win. 
 2 Points: draw. 
 1 Point: loss. 
 0 Points: loss by 3+ goals.

Results

Summaries

1980s

1990s

2000s

2010s

2020s

References

External links

 
International club field hockey competitions in Europe
Women's field hockey competitions in Europe
Recurring sporting events established in 1983
1983 establishments in Europe